Eder Chaux (born  20 December 1991) is a Colombian association footballer. Chaux plays as a goalkeeper for Junior de Barranquilla  in the Colombian Categoría Primera A.

International career
Chaux was named in the provisional Colombia squad for the 2019 Copa America.

References

1991 births
Living people
Colombian footballers
Patriotas Boyacá footballers
Categoría Primera A players
Association football goalkeepers
Real Estelí F.C. players
Alianza Petrolera players
Boyacá Chicó F.C. footballers
Colombian people of Swiss descent
People from Ibagué